Carmelo González may refer to:
 Carmelo Reyes González or Cien Caras (born 1949), Mexican professional wrestler
 Carmelo González (footballer) (born 1983), Spanish footballer